Chadian may refer to:
 Something of, from, or related to the country of Chad
 A person from Chad, or of Chadian descent. For information about the Chadian people, see Demographics of Chad and Culture of Chad. For specific persons, see List of Chadians
 Chadian Arabic, a dialect of Arabic, is the lingua franca of Chad
 Chadic languages. See also Languages of Chad
 Chadian (stage), a substage in the British stratigraphy of the Carboniferous
 Chadian (town) (茶淀镇), town in Binhai New Area, Tianjin, China

See also 
 

Language and nationality disambiguation pages